Biharamulo District is one of the eight districts of the Kagera Region of Tanzania.  It is bordered to the north by Karagwe District and Muleba District, to the east and south by Geita Region, to the west by Ngara District, and to the southwest by the Kigoma Region. Its administrative seat is Biharamulo town. Biharamulo Game Reserve is located within the borders of the district.

According to the 2012 Tanzania National Census, the population of Biharamulo District was 323,486, from 409,389 in 2002, and 209,279 in 1988. This decline in population can be explained from the fact that Chato District was split off from Biharamulo District in between the 2002 and the 2012 census.

Transport

Road
Several trunk roads  pass through Biharamulo District: T3 from Morogoro to the Rwanda border, T4 from Mwanza to Bukoba and T9 from Biharamulo to Kigoma.

Administrative subdivisions
In 2002 the district was divided into 21 wards, but many of these are now part of Chato District. As of 2012, Biharamulo District was administratively divided into 15 wards.

Wards

 Biharamulo Mjini
 Bisibo
 Kabindi
 Kalenge
 Kaniha
 Lusahunga
 Nemba
 Nyabusozi
 Nyakahura
 Nyamahanga
 Nyamigogo
 Nyantakara
 Nyarubungo
 Runazi
 Ruziba

References

External links 
 Bing Map

Districts of Kagera Region